Vacanze di Natale is a 1983 Italian comedy film directed by Carlo Vanzina. It was shown as part of a retrospective on Italian comedy at the 67th Venice International Film Festival.

Plot
In Christmas of 1983 two families collide in Cortina d'Ampezzo. Both are from Rome. One of them (the Covelli family) is seemingly rich, elegant, and with refined taste, although there are some hints that they are parvenu. They consist of consists of mother, father (played by Riccardo Garrone), two sons (of which Christian De Sica) and a daughter. The second (the Marchetti family) is made up of people seemingly vulgar and rough, where the father (played by Mario Brega) is a butcher, and the son is played by Claudio Amendola. The Amendola character and the second son of the rich family are both fans of football club A.S. Roma, and know one another well as they attend together the games every Sunday, and they are happy to see one another, so the families have to spend some time together, despite being seemingly of different social extractions. The stories and adventures of the members of the two families intersect and give rise to hilarious misunderstandings, while a penniless pianist (Jerry Calà) falls in love again with his ex-girlfriend (Stefania Sandrelli). Roberto Covelli (De Sica) has an American girlfriend, who doesn't get his attention and persistently courted by Mario Marchetti (Amendola). The contact between the two families will be done through the acquaintance of Mario with a member of Covelli which, when seen in front of the rude common people of Rome are upset. After many adventures finished good and evil Samantha's girlfriend, Roberto, will notice the sad courting the mild Mario and give him what he wishes for one night before leaving for ever for America. Meanwhile, the Covelli Family, with astonishment and regret, discovers that his young son, Roberto, is gay. One year after the holiday, both families reunite again in Sardinia during the summer and will create a new whirlwind of hilarious situations.

Production
The movie was shot for only three weeks, in the Fall of 1983. The shooting occurred almost completely in the ski resorts of Faloria and Cortina d'Ampezzo. 

Critics and even the producers have framed the movie as a direct representation of the status symbols of the time, without any insertions of social criticism, despite the fact that there are some contradictions between social ambitions of the characters in the movie. The increased well-being of the Italian society in the 1980s is represented by the high- end vacation spots chosen for shooting.

One can note the differences between the quality of the villa inhabited by the Covelli family and the five star hotel where some protagonists are guests (Guido Nicheli, Stefania Sandrelli, and others) and, on the other side, the 3 star hotel (Hotel Fanes, closed since 2002), where the Marchetti family are guests.

On the other hand the common areas of the VIP Club where Jerry Calà plays the piano, or the central Corso Italia, symbolize the tentaqtive of social ramping and the apparent equalization of the characters, due to the crossing of interests and passions.,

Promotion 
Renato Casaro prepared the manifests for the movie promotion to the movie theaters.

Distribution 
The movie, which obtained the permission from the then Ministero del turismo e dello spettacolo permission n. 79461 del 16/12/1983, as per Italian Law n. 161 of 21 April 1962, was distributed in the Italian theaters starting from 23 December 1983.

The movie has been issued in different VHS formats, initially produced by the De Laurentis - Ricordi Video and distributed by the Univideo, was then reprinted both by RCS Edizioni and by Filmauro Home Video with distribution Aurelio De Laurentis Multimedia.

On 15 December 2003 a commemorative evening celebrated the 20th anniversary of the movie.

Reception

Revenue 
At the box office the movie cashed 2,939,774,000 Italian Liras. classifying at the 9th spot for 1983-1984 in Italy.

Critics
The movie, modelled after the 1959 Vacanze d'inverno of Camillo Mastrocinque, was well received from the critics at the time of issuance. Several writers appreciated the director's gusto, drama and a little bit of sentimentalism. In addition several good actors were mixed with experienced ones, similar to what had happened in the Sapore di mare movie. Further critics gave to the movie the merit of photographing directly the characteristics and the contradictions of the 1980s, distinguished by several classes, an increasing well-being, and an appearing possibility of common interests of such classes.

Cast
 Jerry Calà as Billo, the pianist 
 Christian De Sica as Roberto Covelli
 Karina Huff as Samantha
 Claudio Amendola as Mario Marchetti
 Antonella Interlenghi as Serenella
 Riccardo Garrone as Giovanni Covelli
 Rossella Como as Signora Covelli
 Guido Nicheli as Donatone
 Marco Urbinati as Luca Covelli
 Mario Brega as Arturo Marchetti
 Rossana Di Lorenzo as Erminia Marchetti
 Marilù Tolo as Grazia Tassoni
 Stefania Sandrelli as Ivana
 Roberto Della Casa as Cesare
 Paolo Baroni as Collosecco
 Licinia Lentini as Moira
 Moana Pozzi as Luana
 Clara Colosimo as Farmacista

References

External links

1983 films
1983 comedy films
1980s Christmas comedy films
Films directed by Carlo Vanzina
Italian Christmas comedy films
1980s Italian-language films
1980s Italian films